Patribotics is the blog of British-American blogger, novelist and ex-politician Louise Mensch. The blog was launched in January 2017. In addition to hosting articles by Mensch, the site has occasionally hosted articles by Laurelai Bailey, and articles jointly written by Mensch and Claude Taylor, a former official in Bill Clinton’s White House. 

Although some of the reports in Patribotics have been later confirmed by major mainstream news outlets, the blog is controversial and considered by some to be conspiracy theories.

Inception

Louise Mensch, a former British MP who moved from England to the U.S. in 2012, launched Patribotics in January 2017, after stepping down as writer and manager of the news, opinion, and commentary site Heat Street, which she had co-launched in February 2016.

In February 2017, Mensch told  The Guardian that she moved from writing for Heat Street to her own blog site because she prefers the freedom of self-publishing; she stated, "I didn't want to be subject to an editing process. Editors would ask: who are your sources? And I can't tell them." She said that she has been able to cultivate sources in the intelligence community because of her staunch advocacy of US and UK intelligence agencies following former NSA contractor Edward Snowden's revelations about mass surveillance.

Reception

Mensch's inaugural post on Patribotics, titled "Dear Mr. Putin, Let’s Play Chess", was described by Vanity Fair  as a "must-read primer" on the Trump-Russia situation and "prescient as hell", and GlobalSecurity.org quoted it extensively and described it as "well-informed".

Mensch's February 14, 2017 article in Patribotics, which elaborated her theory that the 2016 Anthony Weiner sexting scandal was a hoax perpetrated by Russian-led hackers who also planted Hillary Clinton's emails on Anthony Weiner's laptop, was criticized by several journalists and commentators as conspiracy theory.

Several news outlets and journalists, including Keith Olbermann, have cited Mensch's Trump-Russia Patribiotics articles as credible and informed speculation. Some outlets have characterized assertions Mensch makes in Patribotics as being unsubstantiated theories with varying degrees of plausibility. Some reviewers, including Vox, Slate and The New Republic, have asserted that Patribotics articles overall are conspiracy theories.

References

External links 
 Patribotics – Official site

American political blogs
Internet properties established in 2017